Colegio Urdaneta Ikastetxea is an Augustinian semi-private mixed elementary, middle and high school owned by Congregation for Religious “Provincia Agustiniana del Santísimo Nombre de Jesús de Filipinas”. Its facilities are located in Loiu, Neguri and Moyua, in the province of Biscay, Spain.

This school was ranked in 26th position among the first best one hundred schools in Spain by El Mundo Newspaper in 2017.

See also
 Augustine of Hippo

References

Augustinian schools
Education in the Basque Country (autonomous community)